Eugenius, Eugander, and Abilandius are saints of the Coptic Church. Their feast day is held on March 10.

References

Sources
Holweck, F. G. A Biographical Dictionary of the Saints. St. Louis, MO: B. Herder Book Co. 1924.

Christian saints in unknown century
Year of birth missing
Year of death missing
Coptic Orthodox saints
Saints trios